SS Albert Gallatin was a liberty ship built by California Shipbuilding Corporation of Los Angeles, and delivered in April 1942 to the War Shipping Administration (WSA) with a hull# 277. Name for Albert Gallatin the United States Secretary of the Treasury. Albert Gallatin call sign was LERH.  In April of 1942 she was operated as a United States Merchant Marine ship by the American-Hawaiian Steamship Company. In 1944 she was operated by the Isthmian Steamship Company of New York. On January 2, 1944 she was torpedoed by Japanese submarine I-26 and sunk in the Arabian Sea during World War II.

First attack
On August 28, 1943 at 5:00 pm the Albert Gallatin was attacked by German submarine U-107, commanded by Volker Simmermacher off the coast of Savannah, Georgia. Albert Gallatin was unescorted by any ship when attacked.  Albert Gallatin was traveling northbound 110 miles southeast of Savannah, Georgia with a US Navy K-class blimp K-34. U-107 fired three torpedoes, two missed and one hit the Albert Gallatin propeller with only minor damage, as it failed to detonate.

Sinking

On January 2, 1944 4:52 am Japanese submarine I-26, commanded by Kusaka, torpedoed Albert Gallatin. Albert Gallatin was unescorted in the Arabian Sea at the time. Albert Gallatin was traveling from Aden, Yemen to Bandar Shahpur, Iran with 7954 tons of cargo and mail. All of the crew were able to board the lifeboats. Later the crew of 43 merchants and the 28 United States Navy Armed Guards were picked up by the MV Britannia, built in 1939.

References

 

1942 ships
Liberty ships
Ships built in Los Angeles
Maritime incidents in January 1944
World War II shipwrecks in the Arabian Sea
Ships sunk by Japanese submarines